The Elk Valley is a valley in the southeastern Kootenay region of British Columbia, Canada. Located in the heart of the Canadian Rockies, the Elk Valley is approximately 60 kilometres from the Alberta and Montana borders.

Geography and location
The valley runs via the basin of the Elk River from the southeastern Alberta border near Kananaskis to the Rocky Mountain Trench. Communities in the valley, from uppermost to lowermost, are Elkford, Sparwood, Hosmer, Fernie, Morrissey, and Elko.

History and economy
The valley was an important centre of the coal mining industry in British Columbia for over 100 years, and was a centre of labour activism, regularly returning socialist independents to the legislature. The Elk Valley is the largest producing coal field in the province, producing millions of tons of coal that is shipped to steel mills around the world. All operating coal mines in the Elk Valley are now owned by Teck Resources.

Today, tourism is becoming more important in the area, leading to increasing numbers of weekend snowmobilers, skiers, hikers, anglers, hunters, and other outdoor adventurers.

See also
Elk Valley Provincial Park

 
Valleys of British Columbia
Canadian Rockies
East Kootenay
Regional District of East Kootenay
Teck Resources